Elsa Victoria Canchaya Sánchez was a Peruvian politician and a Congresswoman who represented Junín for the 2006–2011 term.

External links
Official Congressional Site

Year of birth missing (living people)
Living people
Peruvian politicians of Quechua descent
National Unity (Peru) politicians
Members of the Congress of the Republic of Peru
21st-century Peruvian women politicians
21st-century Peruvian politicians
Place of birth missing (living people)
Women members of the Congress of the Republic of Peru